Lake Whittaker is a spring-fed lake located in the township of Thames Centre, just outside the hamlet of Avon. The lake is managed by the Kettle Creek Conservation Authority.

External links
 Kettle Creek Conservation

Lakes of Ontario
Landforms of Middlesex County, Ontario